Kundapur, also called Kundapura, is a coastal town situated in the Udupi district of the state of Karnataka, India. This town was known as Coondapoor while it was part of the erstwhile South Canara district (1862–1947) of the Madras Presidency of British India. Present-day Kundapur is administered by the Kundapur Town Municipal Council and serves as the headquarters of the Kundapur Taluk of Udupi district.

History 

The name Kundapura can be traced to the Kundeshwara Temple built by Kundavarma of the Alupa dynasty who ruled the region in the 10th - 11th century, in the vicinity of the Panchagangavalli River. In Kundagannada language, the word "Kunda" also refers to the flower Jasmine.Where the Majority people of Kundapura grow flower Jasmine in this region which came to be called as kundapura(Land of Jasmine). Kundapura is surrounded by water from three sides. To the north lies the Panchagangavalli River. To the east lies the Kalaghar river. To the west lie the Kodi backwaters sea walk and the Arabian Sea, leaving the south side as the main connecting land mass. All connecting roads to Kundapura enter the city from the southern direction. North side of the town is vast backwaters of Panchagangavali river and a bridge has been constructed across it.

Language 

Kundagannada dialect is spoken by 85% of the population, followed by Tulu, Malayalam, and Konkani. Urdu is also spoken by significant population of locals.

Demographics 
 India census,
 Kundapur has a population of 30,444.
 Males constitute 49% of the population and females 51%.
 Literate population was 25,191, with a Literacy rate of 82%, higher than the national average of 59.5%.

Transport 

Kundapur is connected to other parts of the country by NH66. SH52 is a State Highway that connects to Shimoga District. This Highway connects cities and towns of different states. Kundapur is also connected to the Konkan Railway, which runs from Mumbai to Mangalore.

Kundapura railway station, along the Konkan Railway, is used by Kerala pilgrims who visit Kolluru Mookambika Temple

There are private local buses and some out of town is serviced by government owned buses. Buses can be found for Udupi and Mangalore, and there are multiple bus stands. The main bus stand where the buses to Udupi and Mangalore are available is called "New bus stand", is near the police station. Another frequently used mode of transportation is auto rikshaw.

Notable people 

 
 

 Prakash Padukone
 Deepika Padukone
 Guru Dutt
 Ravi Basrur
 Siddharth Basrur
 K. Shivaram Karanth
 Kota Srinivas Poojary
 Rishab Shetty
 Kashinath (actor)
 Upendra
 Mogeri Gopalakrishna Adiga
 Vaidehi
 Sanchita Padukone

References 

Cities and towns in Udupi district